Cubeck is a hamlet in the Richmondshire district of North Yorkshire, England. It is near Thornton Rust and Worton.

External links

Villages in North Yorkshire